The Office is an Indian television sitcom streaming on Hotstar. It is an adaptation of the original BBC series of the same name, although it follows the American remake more closely. It was co-produced by Applause Entertainment in association with BBC Studios India for Hotstar's new label Hotstar Specials.

Plot
The show is an adaptation of the original British sitcom, based in a branch of Wilkins Chawla. It depicts a 9 to 5 scenario where the boss, Jagdeep Chadda (played by Mukul), desperately tries to keep his employees' morale at an all-time high. He is an overly familiar boss who tells his employees to consider him one of their pals, but unfortunately his weak jokes and failed attempts at camaraderie fail to impress his colleagues, who are perennially bored. While he encourages them relentlessly, audiences get a peek into this quirky work-space.

Production

Development 
In January 2019, Applause Entertainment entered partnership in which they will develop the Indian versions of hit series such as The Office and Criminal Justice.
The Office team set to adapt the entirety of the British version with episode count being 28 for the adaptation.

Casting 
By June 2018, the casting for the show got completed with roping the talents for the lead roles with continued casting for recurring and guest roles.

Cast 

 Mukul Chadda as Jagdeep Chadda, branch manager (based on Michael Scott). The Manager of Wilkins Chawla Faridabad. He is a self-proclaimed "funjabi" boss who thinks his jokes are mostly funny. He finds unique ways to bond with his staff. His age is 42 and still unmarried. His love interests are Riya and Geeta.
 Gopal Datt as Triveni Prasad Mishra, assistant to the branch manager (based on Dwight Schrute). Triveni Prasad (more commonly referred to as T.P. by his colleagues) is the assistant to the branch manager at Wilkins Chawla Faridabad. He is an obsequious employee who is often found with Jagdeep Chaddha. He is a Swadeshi person and often shows his hate towards Western culture by using Ayurvedic products like asafoetida candy, masala cola, and carrom seed tea. He is the prime target of Amit's pranks. He is engaged in wrestling at his akhada in Faridabad Sector 3. In the second season, he develops a secret love interest for Anjali.
 Sayandeep Sengupta as Amit Sharma, salesman (based on Jim Halpert). A salesman at the Wilkins Chawla Faridabad branch. He loves to play pranks in the office, especially with T.P., and with Pammi being his partner in crime. Some of his pranks include shifting T.P.'s desk into the gentleman's toilet, selling his office items on online shopping sites, and many more. He has had a crush on Pammi for a long time, but since Pammi was engaged to be married, he had left the thought of Pammi as his crush but he remained friends with her. He was in a brief relationship with Loveleen, the Office dietician but broke up with her. In Second's last episode before taking a transfer to Wilkins Chawla Gurugram Branch, he opens up his heart and feelings to Pammi about her and kisses her.
 Samridhi Dewan as Pammi Goel, the receptionist (based on Pam Beesley). Pammi is the receptionist at The Wilkins Chawla Faridabad Branch. She is Amit's partner in playing pranks on T.P. She is also the source of news in the office. She is engaged to be married to Parmeet who works in Wilkins Chawla Faridabad branch's warehouse. She wanted to be a graphic designer but left her dreams as Parmeet disapproves it. She considers Amit as her best friend but later even she falls in love with him.
 Abhinav Sharma as Sapan Gill, the intern (based on Ryan Howard). Sapan is an intern working in Wilkins Chawla Faridabad branch.  He is often seen with his headphones and always attends high society parties among the Delhi elite. He is also preparing for the CAT examinations and wants to get into IIM. In the second season, Kitty falls in love with him but he breaks up with her but soon patches up with her. T.P. thinks that Sapan is a spoilt rich brat from Defence Colony.
 Gavin N. Methalaka as Kutty, accountant (based on Kevin Malone). Kutty is an accountant working in Wilkins Chawla Faridabad Branch. He is often seen sitting at the corner of the accountant's corner with a reputation of known closet pervert watching questionable content on his computer. He is also known for being to himself while he indulges with food or table games with Rinchin. He is a big, chubby, and fun-loving guy.
 Preeti Kochar as Sarla Bansal, saleswoman (based on Phyllis Vance). Sarla is the only saleswoman in Wilkins Chawla Faridabad Branch. She is an expert in knitting and sewing. She always calls young employees "putar" ("child" in Punjabi). She is a calm person but occasionally angry either when Prem Chopra is in the office or when T.P. tries to enter the ladies' washroom. Sarla used to be a kabaddi champion in her childhood days but she wasn't included in the Office kabaddi team due to Chadda's sexist policy.
 Priyanka Setia as Anjali, accountant (based on Angela Martin). Anjali is the only female accountant in Wilkins Chawla Faridabad Branch. She is high on Indian values just like T.P. Mishra. She does not participate in any antics of the office like Wilkins Olympics (The Office Olympics), script reading, etc. She is also the first employee in the office to discover Amit and Pammi's relationship is more than just friendship. She is always part of various celebration committees and always prepares Sattavic Snacks like Sabudana Vadas and Gondh Laddoos. She also hates Western values just like T.P. Mishra. In the Second Season, She develops a romantic interest with T.P. Mishra.
 Sunil Jetley as Saleem Ghiani, salesman (based on Stanley Hudson). Saleem Ghiani is the seniormost male employee at the Wilkins Chawla Faridabad branch. He is mostly referred as Saleemji by many colleagues but Chadda refers him as Saleem Sahab. He is often stereotyped by Chadda as a typical Muslim man who likes biryani and Urdu poems but on the contrary he doesn't indulge in Urdu poems and hates biryani. He usually doesn't indulge in many office antics and is irritated by Chadha's actions.
 Chien Ho Liao as Rinchin, accountant (based on Oscar Martinez).
 Spruha Joshi as Geeta (Chaddha's Broker)
 Mallika Dua as Kitty Kataria, customer relations executive (based on Kelly Kapoor) (since season 2).

Recurring
 Gauahar Khan as Riya Pahwa (based on Jan Levinson).
 Nehpal Gautam as Bhadoria Peon (loosely based on Creed Bratton).
 Ankit Gulati as Bhandari, HR executive.
 Kunal Pant as Parmeet, Pammi's fiancé (based on Roy).
 Mayur Bansiwal as Madhukar, HR (based on Toby Flenderson).
 Manpreet Singh as Rajinder, warehouse foreman (based on Darryl Philbin)
 Anandita Pagnis as Loveleen, Amit's girlfriend (based on Amy Adams' character Katy Moore) (Amit broke up with her post-Jim Corbett Office Trip)
 Ranvir Shorey as Prem Chopra, traveling salesman (based on Todd Packer)

Episodes

Season 1 (2019)

Season 2 (2019)

Release 
The first season with episode count of 13 was slated to release on June 28, 2019. The second season which was filmed with first season itself was slated to release on September 15, 2019.

Promotion
The trailer was released by Hotstar on various platforms on 4 June 2019. The team engaged mainly in social media promotions as they poised the series towards younger generations. The promotion for Season 2 was started in early September revealing the release date.

Reception
The series received mixed reviews. The show has a rating of 5.6 based on 5.7K ratings on IMDb. Firstpost reviewed it saying, "Good performances, apt casting make Hotstar's lazily-written remake watchable". New Indian Express had a more mixed view, summarizing it as, "Brownie points for accuracy, but magic lost in translation". Raja Sen from Livemint described it as, "decent, not special". Rohan Nahaar from Hindustan Times rated it 2/5 and called it an "unfunny, unnecessary carbon copy of the American classic".

Accolades

References

External links
 
 The Office on Hotstar

Hindi-language Disney+ Hotstar original programming
2019 Indian television series debuts
Indian drama television series
Hindi-language television shows
Indian television series based on British television series
Television shows set in Mumbai
The Office
Television series by BBC Studios